Charles or Charlie Byrd or Bird may refer to:
 Charlie Byrd (1925–1999), American jazz guitarist
 Charlie Bird (born 1949), Irish journalist
 Charlie "Bird" Parker (1920–55), American jazz saxophonist
 Charles Willing Byrd (1770–1828), early Ohio political leader and jurist
 Charles Smith Bird (1795–1862), English academic, cleric and tutor
 Charles Byrd (fighter) (born 1983), American mixed martial artist

See also
 Charlie Baird (born 1955), Texas criminal defense attorney and judge
 Charles Bird King  (1785–1862), American portrait artist